Acinonyx is a genus within the cat family. The only living species of the genus, the cheetah (A. jubatus), lives in open grasslands of Africa and Asia.

Several fossil remains of cheetah-like cats were excavated that date to the late Pliocene and Middle Pleistocene. These cats occurred in Africa, parts of Europe and Asia about 10,000 years ago. Several similar species, classified in the genus Miracinonyx, lived in North America at the same time; these may have been more closely related to the genus Puma.

Taxonomy 
Acinonyx was proposed by Joshua Brookes in 1828.

Between the late 18th century and the early 20th century, the following Acinonyx species and subspecies were described:
 Felis jubatus by Johann Christian Daniel von Schreber in 1777 was based on earlier descriptions by Comte de Buffon and Thomas Pennant.
 Felis venatica by Griffith in 1821 was based on a sketch of a cheetah from India.
 Cynailurus soemmeringi by Fitzinger in 1855 was a live male cheetah brought by Theodor von Heuglin to Tiergarten Schönbrunn from Kordofan in southern Sudan.
 Acinonyx hecki by Hilzheimer in 1913 was a captive cheetah from Senegal in the Berlin Zoological Garden, named in honour of the zoo's director.
In 1993, Acinonyx was placed in the monophyletic subfamily Acinonychinae. Molecular phylogenetic analysis has shown that it is the sister group of the genus Puma, and it is now placed within the subfamily Felinae.

In addition, the following fossil Acinonyx species were described:
 A. pardinensis the giant cheetah  — by Croizet et Jobert in 1828
 A. intermedius — by Thenius in 1954
 A. aicha  — by Geraads in 1997
 "A. kurteni" — by Christiansen and Mazák in 2009
The "Linxia Cheetah" was initially described on the basis of a skull from Pliocene strata in China, and touted as the most primitive member of the genus. In 2012, A. kurteni was invalidated as a species when the holotype was determined to be a forgery composed of Miocene-aged fragments.

See also 
American cheetahs of the related genus Miracinonyx

References

External links
 
 

 
Mammal genera
Mammal genera with one living species
Extant Pliocene first appearances
Taxa named by Joshua Brookes
Felines